The LSU Tigers baseball team represents Louisiana State University in NCAA Division I college baseball.  The team participates in the West Division of the Southeastern Conference.  The Tigers play home games on LSU's campus at Alex Box Stadium, Skip Bertman Field, and they are currently coached by Jay Johnson.

History

The early years (1893–1926)
During the program's first 30 seasons, LSU had a total of 15 head coaches. No coach's tenure lasted longer than two seasons, with the exception of C. C. Stroud, who was head coach for eight seasons. Stroud coached LSU from 1914 to 1921 and had an overall record of 73–58–5 (.595). The program won at least ten games during four of his eight seasons as head coach.

Harry Rabenhorst (1927–1956)

In 1927, Harry Rabenhorst became head baseball coach and became the longest tenured head baseball coach in LSU history. Rabenhorst began his career at LSU in 1925 as the head coach of the men's basketball team and two years later, in 1927, he also added head baseball coach to his duties. As baseball coach, he won two SEC baseball titles and was named SEC Coach of the Year in 1939 and 1946. Rabenhorst coached the baseball team from 1927 until 1942 when he left to serve in World War II. When he returned, he again coached the baseball team from 1946 until 1956. He finished his baseball coaching career with a record of 220–226–3. Later, as an athletic department administrator, he became the school's athletic director in 1967.

In 1938, LSU's new baseball stadium, referred to as either LSU Diamond or LSU Varsity Baseball Field, opened. The stadium was later renamed Alex Box Stadium for Simeon Alex Box, an LSU letterman (1942) who was killed in North Africa during World War II.

A. L. Swanson (1943–1945)
During Rabenhorst's absence serving in World War II, A. L. Swanson served as head coach from 1943 to 1945. The Tigers won the 1943 SEC Championship under Swanson.

Ray Didier (1957–1963)
Raymond "Ray" Didier was head coach at LSU for 7 seasons from 1957 to 1963. He had an overall record of 104–79–1 (.568). He coached the 1961 team to the SEC championship. He left LSU to become Athletic director and head baseball coach at Nicholls State University.

Waldrop-Smith-Lamabe (1964–1983)
From 1964 to 1983, LSU was led by three head coaches. From 1964 to 1965, Jim Waldrop coached LSU for two seasons and had a 17–24 (.415) record. Jim Smith was head coach for 13 seasons from 1966 to 1978. He finished with an overall record of 238–251 (.487). When he left LSU after the 1978 season, he had the most wins of any head coach in program history. His 1975 team won an SEC championship and was LSU's first NCAA Tournament team. From 1979 to 1983, Jack Lamabe was head coach at LSU for five seasons and had a record of 134–115 (.538).

Skip Bertman (1984–2001)

1984–1990
After playing college baseball at Miami (FL), coaching high school baseball, and serving as an assistant at Miami, Skip Bertman became LSU's head coach for the start of the 1984 season.

In Bertman's second season, 1985, the Tigers qualified for postseason play for the first time in ten years.  In his third season, LSU made its first appearance in the College World Series in Omaha, Nebraska, the first of 11 appearances during Bertman's 18-year career.  LSU returned to Omaha during the 1987 season, then failed to make the NCAA tournament in 1988, despite having a 39–21 record.

Bertman's 1989 team returned to the postseason, an appearance that started a streak of 17 consecutive postseason appearances.  The 1989 team defeated Texas A&M in a regional final to qualify for the College World Series. The program also made the College World Series in 1990.

1991 national championship

The program won its first national championship in 1991, defeating Wichita State in the College World Series final.

1993 national championship

The program won its second national championship in 1993, again defeating Wichita State in the College World Series final.

1996 national championship

In 1996, the Tigers entered the NCAA Tournament on a two-game losing streak, after being eliminated from the SEC Tournament by consecutive losses to Florida and Kentucky.  However, based on the team's regular season performance, LSU was selected as one of the eight regional host sites for the NCAA tournament.  The Tigers defeated Austin Peay, UNLV, and New Orleans before defeating Georgia Tech, 29–13, in the regional final. In the game, LSU broke multiple NCAA records, two of which still stand today: 13 hits in an inning and 8 doubles in an inning.

In the College World Series, the team defeated its first opponent, Wichita State, 9–8.  LSU then faced Florida, which had beaten them three times in the regular season and once in the SEC Tournament, and won, 9–4.  Florida came out of the losers' bracket to face LSU again, and LSU won, 2–1, to advance to the national championship game against Miami (FL).

In the game, LSU defeated Miami, 9–8, on a walk-off home run by Warren Morris.  In the bottom of the 9th inning with two outs and the tying run on third base, Morris hit a home run to right field off of Miami freshman Robbie Morrison.  The home run was Morris's first of the season, and it won the 1997 Showstopper of the Year ESPY Award.

1997 national championship

LSU entered the 1997 season attempting to become the first team to win consecutive national championships since Stanford won championships in 1987 and 1988. The Tigers began the season with 19 consecutive wins, giving them 27 straight wins starting with the 1996 regional.

In the South I Regional, LSU lost the winner's bracket final to South Alabama, meaning the team had to win three games within 24 hours in order to advance to the College World Series. The Tigers won a five-hour game against Long Beach State, 14–7 in 11 innings, in which Bertman was ejected in the eighth inning for arguing a balk call. LSU then defeated South Alabama 14–4 and 15–4 to advance to the World Series.

There, the Tigers narrowly defeated Rice, but Larson's home run in the bottom of the seventh gave LSU a 5–4 victory. The Tigers then defeated Stanford, 10–5 and 13–9, before defeating Alabama 13–6 in the championship game.

1998 season
In 1998, LSU hit 161 home runs. Eddy Furniss won the Dick Howser Trophy as the nation's most outstanding player and finished as the LSU and SEC all-time leader in home runs (80), RBI (308), hits (352), doubles (87) and total bases (689). Brad Cresse and Trey McClure also earned All-America honors by hitting 29 and 27 home runs, respectively.

The Tigers went undefeated in the South II Regional to reach the College World Series, seeking to become the first team to win three consecutive championships since USC won five consecutive from 1970 to 1974. LSU hit eight home runs in its first game in Omaha, defeating USC, 12–10, then hit six more in a 10–8 victory over SEC team Mississippi State. However, in the final two games, and the Tigers lost 5–4 and 7–3 to USC, which went on to win the championship with a 21–14 victory over Arizona State.

2000 national championship

In 2000, LSU's regular season record was 39–17, and the team went undefeated in the SEC Tournament to earn the #2 National seed in the NCAA Tournament.  LSU won the Baton Rouge Regional in three games, outscoring opponents 45–4.  LSU then swept a best-of-three Super Regional against UCLA, winning 8–2 and 14–8.

LSU began play at the College World Series with a 13–5 win over Texas. In game two, LSU defeated USC, 10–4.  In a close third game, LSU defeated Florida State, 6–3, and advanced to the championship game to face Stanford.

In the championship game on June 17, Stanford held an early 5–2 lead, but LSU scored three runs in the eighth inning with two home runs.  LSU reliever Trey Hodges did not allow a run in the top of the ninth, his fourth scoreless inning of the game.  In the bottom of the ninth, LSU lead the inning off with a single and a walk to bring Brad Cresse to the plate with two runners on base.  Cresse, who was 1–12 in the CWS prior to the at bat, hit a line drive single into left field to score Ryan Theriot from second, giving LSU its fifth national championship in 10 years.  LSU had 5 players named to the All-Tournament team– Blair Barbier, Mike Fontenot, Brad Hawpe, Hodges, and Theriot.  Hodges was named the Tournament's Most Outstanding Player after finishing the CWS with a 2–0 record and one save.

LSU finished the 2000 postseason with a 13–0 record and moved to 5–0 all time in national championship games.

Retirement
Skip Bertman led the Tigers to a 44–22–1 mark during his final season as head coach in 2001. The Tigers won the West Division, reached the SEC Tournament championship game, and won the Baton Rouge Regional, but lost in three games in a Super Regional against Tulane at Zephyr Field.

Bertman won 870 games, seven SEC titles, and 11 CWS appearances.  His teams averaged 48 wins per year and qualified for the NCAA tournament in 16 of his 18 seasons.

His jersey number, 15, is one of four numbers retired by LSU.  LSU also renamed a part of South Stadium Drive, between Nicholson and River Road, Skip Bertman Drive in his honor. The renamed portion runs past the old Alex Box Stadium, which has now been demolished following the opening of LSU's new stadium in 2009, the field of which is named for Bertman.

In a Baseball America poll published in 1999, Bertman was voted the second greatest college baseball coach of the 20th century, behind Rod Dedeaux of Southern California.

In June 2002, Bertman was inducted into the Louisiana Sports Hall of Fame. He was inducted into the American Baseball Coaches Association Hall of Fame in January 2003. In 2006, Skip Bertman was inducted into the inaugural class of the College Baseball Hall of Fame in Lubbock, Texas.

After the end of the 2001 season, Bertman became LSU's athletic director.  During his tenure, LSU won six total national championships and two BCS National Titles.  Bertman served in the position until June 2008, and as Athletic Director Emeritus until June 2010.

In anticipation of Bertman's retirement, Louisiana-Monroe coach Smoke Laval was brought on as an administrative assistant for the LSU baseball team in 2001 and succeeded Bertman as coach in 2002.  Laval was returning to LSU where he served as an assistant coach under Bertman from 1984 to 1993.  In 1993, Laval left LSU for ULM (then known as Northeast Louisiana).  While at NLU/ULM, Laval posted a record of 241–159, a winning percentage of .603, and led the Indians (Now Warhawks) to 3 NCAA regional appearances.

The Smoke Laval (2002–2006)

The expectations were lofty for Laval when he accepted the job as head coach at LSU.  In his first year, Laval led the Tigers to a 44–22 record overall.  The Tigers hosted a regional in Baton Rouge, which they won, and moved on to the Houston Super-Regional to face Rice, where their season ended.  His first year at the helm raised expectations even more after he experienced great success.

In 2003 and 2004, Laval would lead the Tigers to 45–22–1 and 46–19 overall record respectively.  LSU would earn the No. 2 national seed in the 2003 tournament, and would host a super regional both years, meaning the road to Omaha went through Baton Rouge.  LSU made the College World Series both years, but disappointed both years, posting an 0–2 record each year.  Tiger fans were not used to leaving Omaha without a win, so questions about Laval's leadership and ability to continue the success of the program began to arise.

In 2005, LSU struggled during the regular season despite a 40–22 record overall.  The Tigers lost 12 games in SEC play and lost to Southern for only the second time in 41 tries.  Rice would go on to defeat the Tigers in the Baton Rouge Regional Finals.

It was obvious that 2006 would be a critical year for Laval.  However, that year would see LSU post a 35–24 mark overall, their worst since 1983.  They also posted their first losing SEC record in 23 years and would miss the NCAA tournament for the first time in 18 years.  Under growing pressure from fans and the administration, Laval officially resigned on June 4, 2006.

The Paul Mainieri (2007–2021)

2007–2008

On June 28, 2006, Paul Mainieri was named the twenty-fifth head coach of LSU Baseball.  Mainieri returned to Baton Rouge, where he began his career in college baseball 30 years earlier as a freshman at LSU in 1976.  Mainieri finished his collegiate playing career at the University of New Orleans.  Prior to his arrival at LSU, Mainieri coached St. Thomas University in Florida, Air Force, and Notre Dame.

In his first season at LSU, the Tigers posted a mark of 29–26–1. The season was full of ups and downs, with the Tigers winning four SEC series against Top 25 opponents, but struggling in non-conference play. After the season, Mainieri realized changes had to be made and informed certain players that they should consider other options, as well as making some changes to his current staff.  Mainieri was able to put together a tremendous recruiting class following the 2007 season, which was later ranked No. 1 by Baseball News.

In his second year, LSU was predicted to finish fifth in the SEC Western division by the SEC baseball coaches before the year started. Following an amazing turnaround, Coach Mainieri led LSU to the SEC Western Division championship with a conference record of 18–11–1, and the No. 2 seed in the 2008 SEC baseball tournament.  The Tigers finished the regular season record at 39–16–1. The team won the 2008 SEC Tournament (held May 20–25 in Hoover, Alabama). With the win, LSU won 20 consecutive games, breaking the previous school record of 19 consecutive wins during the 1997 season and tying the SEC's second-longest streak of wins.  Fourteen of those wins were come-from-behind wins, while the last 15 were made wearing the distinctive gold jerseys.

By winning the SEC Tournament, LSU earned a 7th national seed in the NCAA tournament and extended the life of the old Alex Box Stadium as Baton Rouge hosted a regional bracket of the NCAA tournament.  LSU swept the series, defeating Texas Southern (12–1) and Southern Miss (twice, 13–4 and 11–4) to win the regional bracket.  With the sweep of the Regional series, LSU extended their winning streak to a SEC-record 23 straight games.

As a result of the Regional, LSU and Baton Rouge earned a spot in the Super-Regional series, hosting UC-Irvine in the last three games to be played in the old Alex Box Stadium. LSU lost the first game, 11–5, ending their streak of wins at 23.  LSU recovered in the second game of the series, scoring six runs in the top of the ninth inning to force a third game with a dramatic come-from-behind win, 9–7. On Monday, June 9, 2008, in the final game to be played at the Alex Box Stadium, with a record-setting crowd of 8,173 watching, LSU dominated UC-Irvine with a 21–7 win to move to the 2008 College World Series.

In the 2008 College World Series, No. 7 LSU faced the No. 2 North Carolina Tarheels in the first round, losing 8–4. The Tigers, facing elimination in a game against the Rice Owls, won in dramatic fashion, 6–5, continuing their string of come-from-behind victories.  On June 20, 2008, after a rain delay of nearly 24 hours, UNC and LSU resumed their elimination game matchup, resulting in a 7–3 loss for LSU. The team was defeated after giving up the only grand slam in the 2008 CWS in the top of the ninth inning. During the 2008 regular and post-regulation baseball season, LSU's games have continuously featured both dramatic victories and controversial calls.

2009 National championship

The 2009 season was the first for LSU playing at Alex Box Stadium, Skip Bertman Field. In the post-season, LSU traveled to Omaha after sweeping Southern University, Baylor University and the University of Minnesota in the regionals and Rice University in the super regionals.

They started play at the College World Series and faced the Virginia Cavaliers in the first round, winning 9–5. In the winner's bracket game, LSU played the Arkansas Razorbacks and won by a score of 9–1. In a rematch, the Tigers beat the Razorbacks again by a score of 14–5, advancing to the CWS finals for the first time since 2000. They played against the Texas Longhorns in a best-of-three series for the title, and won Game 1, 7–6 in a dramatic comeback win in 11 innings. The Longhorns beat the Tigers in game 2, 5–1, to force a third and final game. The Tigers out-slugged the Longhorns 11–4 in game 3 to win their 6th National Championship and first since 2000. The series MVP was outfielder Jared Mitchell.

2010–2021
Under Mainieri, the Tigers also played in the 2013 and 2015 College World Series. During the 2015 MLB Draft, Alex Bregman was selected by the Houston Astros with the second pick of the draft. He was the fifth LSU Tiger to be drafted in the first round in seven years, the highest-drafted position player in LSU's history, and the second-highest overall behind pitcher Ben McDonald (1989).
 
In 2017, LSU played Florida in a best-of-three series to determine the winner of the 2017 College World Series. Florida defeated LSU and the Tigers finished as College World Series runner-up for the first time in school history.

Mainieri retired following LSU's 2021 super regional loss to SEC rival Tennessee at Knoxville. In 15 full seasons (the 2020 season ended after 17 games due to the COVID-19 pandemic), Mainieri compiled a 641-285-3 (.692) record.

Championships

National championships

College World Series appearances

Traditions

Attendance
Total Attendance: As of the 2018 baseball season, LSU has finished No. 1 in the final college baseball total attendance rankings in 23 straight seasons. LSU posted a total attendance figure of 399,085 in 37 games.

In 2013, LSU posted an NCAA-record total attendance figure of 473,298 in 43 games, which was 191,458 greater than second-place team Mississippi State (281,840). LSU is also the only school in NCAA history to exceed 400,000 in total baseball attendance in a season.

Average Attendance: As of the 2018 baseball season, LSU finished No. 1 in the final average attendance rankings for the 22nd time in 23 years (Arkansas finished No. 1 in average attendance in 2007). In 2018, LSU averaged 10,786 tickets sold per game.

Largest Home Attendance: LSU's paid attendance figure of 12,844 for the LSU-Notre Dame game on February 16, 2018, established a school record.

Gold Jerseys
LSU introduced gold jerseys for the 1996 post-season. The Tigers went on to win their 3rd National Championship that year while wearing the gold jerseys in the championship game. The jerseys became part of LSU Baseball lore when with 2 outs and a runner on third base with LSU losing 8–7 in the bottom of the 9th inning, LSU's Warren Morris swung at the first pitch and lined the ball just inches over the right field fence for a game winning walk-off home run. This was his first home run of the season as he had missed 39 games with a broken bone in his hand. The jerseys became more ingrained in LSU lore when the Tigers also wore them during the 1997 post-season which resulted in another national championship, the program's 4th. After the 1996 and 1997 National Championships, the baseball program reserved the gold jerseys for select games.

Under head coach Paul Mainieri, the team wears the gold jerseys regularly on the third game of a three-game series, as well as during important tournament games. One such game was game 3 of the 2009 College World Series Finals versus the Texas Longhorns. The Tigers defeated the Longhorns 11–4 to win the programs 6th National Championship wearing the gold jerseys.

LSU Bat Girls
The LSU Bat Girls are a support squad that contributes to the LSU Baseball program. The Bat Girls consist of 30 individuals who work in teams of 10 at all home games, post-season games and various charity events. The squad serves as hostesses at Alex Box Stadium, Skip Bertman Field and their responsibilities include selling game day programs, recovering foul balls, retrieving bats and helmets, answering fans questions, assisting with game day promotions and giveaways and checking on umpires. They also assist the athletic department with many different aspects of the game such as attending coaches committee meetings.

Tailgating
Tailgating is found across campus with many fans tailgating in the same spot year after year. Some tailgaters form affiliations or organizations and name their "tailgating krewes".

LSU has continually been ranked as the top tailgating location in the country. ESPN.com ranked LSU as the top tailgating destination in America. The Sporting News proclaimed "Saturday Night in Death Valley" and Tiger tailgating as the top tradition in college football. Sports Illustrated said, "When It Comes To Great Tailgating, Nothing Compares To LSU." LSU's tailgating was named No. 1 in an Associated Press poll on top tailgating spots and by a CNN network survey on top tailgating locations.

Visiting team supporters can be heckled and chants of "Tiger Bait! Tiger Bait!" are sometimes directed at opposing teams' fans. The opposing fans who take the jeers and jaunts with a sporting disposition will be invited to join in on the party, the drink, the regional Cajun cuisine, the spirit of Baton Rouge, and the vibrant tradition of LSU sports. During baseball season some fans will tailgate for the entire three days of a weekend series.

Stadiums

Alex Box Stadium, Skip Bertman Field

Alex Box Stadium, Skip Bertman Field is a baseball stadium in Baton Rouge, Louisiana.  It is the home stadium of the Louisiana State University Tigers college baseball team since 2009. The stadium section (and LSU's previous baseball stadium  to the north) were named for Simeon Alex Box, an LSU letterman (1942), purple heart and distinguished service cross recipient, who was killed in North Africa during World War II. In 2013, the field was named in honor of former LSU head baseball coach and athletic director, Skip Bertman.

Alex Box Stadium

Alex Box Stadium was a baseball stadium in Baton Rouge, Louisiana.  It was the home field of the Louisiana State University Tigers college baseball team from 1938 to 2008. It was most notable for The Intimidator, a large billboard behind the right-field fence featuring the six years in which LSU had won the College World Series while playing in the stadium. The field was also notable for giving up many home runs due to the high humidity of Louisiana, the prevailing winds out of the south which push balls hit to left field out of the park, and the short fences (the dimensions were believed to be anywhere from 7–10 feet shorter than what was posted on the fences).

Second LSU Diamond
For the 1936 and 1937 seasons, LSU Baseball played on its second diamond on the new Baton Rouge campus. The playing field was located north of Tiger Stadium and was equipped with wooden bleachers.

First LSU Diamond
From 1929 to 1936, the LSU Baseball team played their home games on a field located on the Campanile Parade Grounds.

State Field

State Field was the home field for the LSU baseball team from 1893 to 1924. The field was located on the old downtown campus of LSU. It was located south of the Pentagon Barracks and slightly southwest of the site of the current Louisiana State Capitol Building adjacent to the Hill Memorial Library and George Peabody Hall. The field was later moved to a site with bleachers that was north of the campuses experimental garden, and next to the old armory building. The field was known on the campus simply as the "athletic field" and was also used for LSU's basketball and football teams.

Practice and training facilities

Worley Family Batting Cage Pavilion
The Worley Family Batting Cage Pavilion holds the LSU indoor batting cages behind the right field wall at Alex Box Stadium, Skip Bertman Field. The facility allows the Tigers baseball team to practice year-round without interference from inclement weather.

LSU Baseball Strength and Conditioning facility
The LSU Tigers baseball team weight room is over 10,000 square feet and includes multi-purpose flat surface platform, bench, incline, squat and Olympic lifting stations along with dumbbell bench stations. It is also equipped with medicine balls, hurdles, plyometric boxes, assorted speed and agility equipment, treadmills, stationary bikes and elliptical cross trainers. The weight room features multiple high-definition TV's for multimedia presentations. It is located in the LSU Football Operations Center.

Head coaches

Records are through the end of the 2021 Season

Year-by-year results

*Through the end of the 2022 season.
''*Final Rankings are from Collegiate Baseball Division I Final Polls (1959–2022)
Sources:

LSU in the NCAA tournament
The NCAA Division I baseball tournament started in 1947.
The format of the tournament has changed through the years.

College World Series: 40–27
NCAA Super Regionals: 18–16
NCAA Regionals: 105–27

NCAA records

Individual records

Sources:

Team records

National College Baseball Hall of Fame inductees

Players

Coaches

Retired numbers

Player awards

National award winners

Dick Howser Trophy
Eddy Furniss (1998)
Golden Spikes Award
Ben McDonald (1989)
Brooks Wallace Award
Alex Bregman (2013)
Collegiate Baseball Player of the Year
Ben McDonald (1989)
Lloyd Peever (1992)

Johnny Bench Award
Brad Cresse (2000)
Pitcher of the Year Award
Aaron Nola (2014)
Rotary Smith Award
Ben McDonald (1989)

First-team All-Americans
The following is a listing of the selections listed in the 2015 LSU Baseball Media Guide on LSUsports.net.

1961
Allen Smith (P) – ABCA
1974
Mike Miley (2B) – Sporting News
1988
Ben McDonald (P) – Baseball America
1989
Ben McDonald (P) – Consensus
1990
Wes Grisham (OF) – Baseball America
1992
Lloyd Peever (P) – Consensus
1993
Brett Laxton (P) – NCBWA
Todd Walker (2B) – Consensus
1994
Russ Johnson (SS) – NCBWA
Todd Walker (2B) – Consensus
1995
Scott Schultz (P) – NCBWA
1996
Eddy Furniss (1B) – Consensus
Eddie Yarnall (P) – Baseball America, NCBWA
1997
Patrick Coogan (P) – NCBWA
Brandon Larson (SS) – ABCA, Baseball American, NCBWA, Sporting News
1998
Brad Cresse (C) – Sporting News
Eddy Furniss (1B) – Consensus

1999
Kurt Ainsworth (P) – Baseball America
2000
Brad Cresse (C) – Consensus
2003
Aaron Hill (SS) – Baseball America
2004
Jon Zeringue (OF) – NCBWA, USA Today/Sports Weekly
2005
Ryan Patterson (OF) – NCBWA, USA Today/Sports Weekly
2008
Blake Dean (OF) – Baseball America
2009
Louis Coleman (P) – Consensus
2011
Mikie Mahtook (OF) – ABCA, Baseball America
2012
Kevin Gausman (P) – ABCA, Collegiate Baseball, Perfect Game
Raph Rhymes (OF) – ABCA, Collegiate Baseball, NCBWA
2013
Mason Katz (1B) – NCBWA
Aaron Nola (P) – NCBWA, Baseball America, Perfect Game, ABCA
Alex Bregman (SS) – Baseball America, Perfect Game, ABCA
2015
Alex Bregman (SS) – Baseball America
2017
Greg Deichmann (OF) – Consensus

National Freshmen of the Year
The following is a listing of LSU players selected as national freshmen of the year.

1992
Todd Walker (2B) Baseball America
1993
Brett Laxton (P) Baseball America
2000
Mike Fontenot (2B) Collegiate Baseball

2001
Lane Mestepey (P) Collegiate Baseball
2013
Alex Bregman (SS) Collegiate Baseball, NCBWA, Baseball America, Perfect Game

SEC award winners

Player of the Year Award
Russ Johnson (1993)
Todd Walker (1994)
Eddy Furniss (1996)
Aaron Hill (2003)
Jon Zeringue (2004)
Raph Rhymes (2012)
Dylan Crews (2022)
Pitcher of the Year
Louis Coleman (2009)
Aaron Nola (2013, 2014)

Freshman of the Year Award
Mike Fontenot (2000)
Lane Mestepey (2001)
Matty Ott (2009)
Alex Bregman (2013)
Alex Lange (2015)

All-College World Series
The following is a listing of LSU players that were selected to the all-tournament teams during the College World Series.

1987
Gregg Patterson (P)
1988
Tim Clark (OF)
Lyle Mouton (OF)
1991
Chad Ogea (P)
Gary Hymel (C)^*
Lyle Mouton (OF)*
John Tellechea (1B)
1993
Adrian Antonini (C)
Jim Greely (OF)
Brett Laxton (P)
Armando Ríos (OF)
Mike Sirotka (P)
Todd Walker (2B)^*
1994
Todd Walker (2B)*
1996
Justin Bowles (OF)
Tim Lanier (C)
Eddie Yarnall (P)

1997
Tom Bernhardt (OF)
Eddy Furniss (1B)
1998
Cedrick Harris (OF)
2000
Blair Barbier (3B)
Mike Fontenot (2B)
Brad Hawpe (1B)
Trey Hodges (P)^
Ryan Theriot (SS)
2009
D. J. LeMahieu (2B)
Jared Mitchell (OF)^
Anthony Ranaudo (P)
Ryan Schimpf (OF)
2015
Kade Scivicque (C)
2017
Antoine Duplantis (OF)
Michael Papierski (C)

Legend
^ denotes player was named MOP of the College World Series
* denotes selection to College World Series All-Decade team

National team members

Coaches awards

National Coach of the Year

National team coaches

LSU and MLB
The LSU Tigers baseball team has had 82 players reach Major League Baseball (MLB).

See also
List of NCAA Division I baseball programs

References

External links

 
Baseball teams established in 1893
1893 establishments in Louisiana